Alan Charles Klein (born 29 June 1940) is an English singer-songwriter and musician. He wrote the soundtrack for the stage play and film, What a Crazy World (1963). In 1964, he released his only solo album, Well at Least It's British, that was re-released in 2008 by RPM Records.

Klein was born in Clerkenwell, London. Many of his recordings were made with the record producer, Joe Meek.

In 1966 he went on tour as lead vocalist of The New Vaudeville Band.

Writing credits
1962 "What a Crazy World We're Living In" – Recorded by Joe Brown and the Bruvvers. Piccadilly 7N35024
1962 "My Very First Love" – Recorded by Ronnie Hall on Piccadilly 7N35040
1962 "A Lay-Abouts Lament" – Recorded by Joe Brown and the Bruvvers on Piccadilly 7N35047
1962 "At Times Like These" – Recorded by Ricky Valance on Columbia DB4787
1963 "Sally Ann" – Recorded by Freddie and the Dreamers on Columbia SEG8287 EP
1963 "Our Streets Annual Outing" – Recorded by The Bachelors on Decca LK4519 LP
1963 "Save Your Love for Me" – Recorded by Marty Wilde on Columbia DB7145
1963 "Sally Ann" – Recorded by Joe Brown and the Bruvvers on Piccadilly 7N35138
1963 "Come Back When You're Ready" – Co-written with J. Duncan, and recorded by Freddie and the Dreamers on Columbia DB7214
1964 "I'm a Dreamer" – Recorded by Donald Peers on Columbia DB7226
1964 "As Long As You Love Me a Little" – Recorded by Donald Peers on Columbia DB7299
1964 "Big Talk From a Little Man" – Recorded by Don Charles on HMV POP1332
1965 "I Would Give All" – Co-written with John McLeod, and recorded by The Harbour Lites on HMV POP1465
1965 "I'll See You Around" – Recorded by John Mantell on CBS201783
1966 "I Just Can't Fool My Heart" – Recorded by Danny Storm on Piccadilly 7N35091
1966 "It Ain't Worth the Lonely Road Back" – Recorded by Pozo Seco Singers on Columbia (US) 4-43636
1966 "Little Ray of Sunshine" – Recorded by Joe Brown on Pye 7N17135

Discography

Singles
1962 "Striped Purple Shirt" – Written and recorded by Klein on Oriole 45 CB1719 (A Side)
1962 "Three Coins in the Sewer" – Written and recorded by Klein on Oriole 45 CB1737 (A Side)
1962 "Danger Ahead" – Written by J. Francis and recorded by Klein on Oriole 45 CB1737 (B Side)
1965 "It Ain't Worth the Lonely Road Back" – Written and recorded by Klein on Parlophone R5292 (A Side)
1965 "I've Cried So Many Tears" – Written and recorded by Klein on Parlophone R5292 (B Side)
1965 "Age of Corruption" – Written and recorded by Klein on Parlophone R5370 (A Side)
1965 "I'm Counting On You" – Written and recorded by Klein on Parlophone R5370 (B Side)
1969 "Honey Pie" – Written by Lennon and McCartney, recorded by Klein on Page One POF119 (A Side)
1969 "You Turned a Nightmare into a Dream" – Written and recorded by Klein on Page One POPF119 (B Side)
1970 "Dinner's in the Ice Box" – Written and recorded by Klein on Decca F13033 (A Side)
1970 "Here I Am, There You Are" – Written and recorded by Klein on Decca F13033 (B Side)
1970 "Nothing Like a Long Gone Man" – Written and recorded by Klein on Decca F13091 (A Side)
1970 "Dreams of Youth" – Written and recorded by Klein on Decca F13091 (B Side)

"Honey Pie/You Turned A Nightmare Into a Dream" was also released in the USA, under the pseudonym "Earl of Cricklewood" (Page One 21,021, March 1969).

Albums
1964 Well at Least It's British – Written and recorded by Klein on Decca

References

1940 births
Living people
English male singer-songwriters
English pop singers
People from Clerkenwell
Singers from London
The New Vaudeville Band members